Chesil Cove is a curved steep bank forming the south-east end of  Chesil Beach in Dorset, England. It is thus part of one of three large shingle structures in Britain, extending from West Bay to the Isle of Portland (Portland Bill), the latter acting more firmly as a great barrier (groyne) which stops tidal action from washing the beach away and leads to the high depositions by wind and tide action forming the grand curved bank of this "cove". The "cove", bill and much of Chesil Beach give shelter from the prevailing winds and waves for much of Weymouth Bay, the town of Weymouth and the village of Chiswell. It forms part of the Jurassic Coast.

Flooding defences
The adjoining village of Chiswell was established predominately as a fishing community. Despite its vulnerability to sea storms and flooding, Chiswell developed into a thriving community. One of the best-documented incidents of flooding occurred in the Great Storm of 1824. The storm saw the death of thirty residents, the destruction of eighty houses, and the damage of many others. The construction of a sea wall finally commenced in 1958, and work on this scheme continued until 1965. The wall extended from the far end of Chesil Cove, at West Weares, to the location of the village's Cove House Inn. A promenade was laid-out on top of the wall, and this became a popular attraction.

Despite the sea wall proving a worthy defence, incidents of widespread flooding continue. During December 1978 and February 1979, two major storms caused further devastation to Chiswell. Accordingly, further defence were installated during the 1980s. During January–February 2014, violent storms across the south-west of England caused more flooding in the village.

Recreation

Diving
Chesil Cove is a popular site for scuba divers. It has become one of the best known shore dives in the UK. The cove is a reasonably shallow shore dive, and has an interesting selection of south coast marine life, as well as an abundance of flora and fauna. Although there have been many shipwrecks in the cove, few significant divable remains exist close to the beach due to its exposure to strong waves.

Fishing
Through fishing, the beach provided the main occupation for the villagers of Chiswell and the rest of the islanders. The beach is still used by sea anglers and the British record for shore-captured shore rockling was set there in 1992. Recreational fishing is a popular pastime at the cove.

Shipwrecks
Chesil Beach, and the cove, have seen many cases of shipwrecks, more so than most other parts of the British coast, particularly during the age of sail. Chesil Beach became infamously known as "Deadman's Bay", taken after the name Thomas Hardy gave West Bay, including Chesil Cove, in his novel The Well Beloved of 1892.

The local fishermen, particularly at Portland, developed a purpose-built vessel to withstand the sea actions at Chesil Beach. The boat, known as a Lerret, is a double-ended open fishing boat, used for seine net fishing. The 18th-century public house The Cove House Inn remains one of Portland's most popular pubs and is Grade II Listed. Despite its particularly vulnerable position on the beach, the pub was a survivor of the Great Storm of 1824.

Shipwreck list
Some of the ships wrecked at Chesil Cove include:

 John - 1669 - English cargo vessel, crew and cargo saved
 Angel Guardian - 1681 - cargo vessel, 6,000 oranges recovered
 Peter - 1685 - French cargo vessel, four hogsheads of French wine saved
 De Hoop - 1749 - Dutch West Indiaman, all crew saved
 Johanna Theresa - 22 January 1753 - Dutch craft, the captain and five men drowned
 Biscaye - 1754 - Spanish cargo vessel
 Fanny - 1760 - British brigantine involved in slave trade
 Zenobie - 12 January 1762 - French privateer
 Le Pelerin - 10 August 1784 - French craft
 Nancy - 13 August 1793 - British brig, crew and part cargo saved
 Peggy - 3 June 1796 - American cargo vessel, four of eleven crew saved
 Rodney - 26 September 1799 - English brigantine vessel, all crew saved
 Hayward - 26 September 1799 - English brigantine vessel, all crew saved
 Concord - 26 September 1799 - English brigantine vessel, all crew saved
 Smith - 26 September 1799 - English brigantine vessel, all crew saved
 Endeavour - 1800 - British craft, all crew saved
 Nancy - 24 March 1801 - British craft
 Le Mercuria - 4 March 1818 - 500-ton French vessel, 20-30 drowned
 Pollux - 20 October 1820 - brig, one crew lost
 Iris - 7 November 1823 - Swedish brig, the master and three of six crew men saved
 Wasster Norland - 26 November 1824 - Swedish sailing vessel, six of ten crew men saved
 Leonora - 3 December 1824 - Dutch Galliot, all crew and cargo lost
 Haabets Anker - 11 December 1828 - Norwegian brig, all crew saved
 Atlas - 9 December 1831 - American brig, nine of eleven crew saved
 Amyntas - 30 November 1841 - English brig, master and three crew drowned
 Maria Johanna - April 1852 - Dutch galliot, four of crew of seven lost
 Amalie - 1 February 1869 - German brig
 Edwin & Sarah - 5 January 1882 - ketch
 Sapphire - 8 August 1883 - English schooner, all crew of six saved by coastguard rocket apparatus
 Christiana - 2 September 1883 - Norwegian barque, eight of crew of ten saved
 Fannie C - 3 October 1890 - schooner, beached whilst on fire, 10 saved
 Ora et Labora - 13 October 1891 - Norwegian brig
 Emma Maria - 25 October 1903 - Russian schooner
 Patria - 26 October 1903 - Norwegian barque
 Dorothea - 14 February 1914 - Dutch cargo steamship
 Preveza - 15 January 1920 - Greek vessel
 Ellida - 1920 - salvage tug
 Madeleine Tristan - 20 September 1930 - French schooner, all crew saved

See also
List of Dorset beaches

References

External links

Isle of Portland
Beaches of Dorset
Jurassic Coast
Coves of Dorset
Underwater diving sites in England